Lullaby for the Working Class was an indie folk rock band from Lincoln, Nebraska, active from the mid-to-late 1990s. Fronted by Omaha, Nebraska singer-songwriter Ted Stevens (of the bands Mayday and Cursive), the group also featured multi-instrumentalist and producer Mike Mogis of Bright Eyes, his brother, producer A.J. Mogis, and drummer Shane Aspegren of Berg Sans Nipple.

Discography

Albums
Blanket Warm (1996 · Bar/None Records)
I Never Even Asked for Light (1997 · Bar/None Records)
Song (1999 · Bar/None Records)

Singles
Consolation (1996)
In Honor of My Stumbling (1997)
The Hypnotist (1997) (released on Rykodisc Europe)
The Ebb & Flow, The Come & Go, The To & Fro (1998)

See also
Mayday

External links
Bar/None Records

Indie rock musical groups from Nebraska